Bongani Jele (born 1 April 1986) is a South African cricket umpire. He is part of Cricket South Africa's umpire panel for first-class matches. Along with Adrian Holdstock he umpired the final of the 2015–16 Ram Slam T20 Challenge in December 2015 and he stood in the first-class tour match between South Africa A and England XI later the same month.

He stood in his first One Day International (ODI) match, between Australia and Ireland in Benoni, South Africa, on 27 September 2016. He stood in his first Twenty20 International (T20I) match, between South Africa and Sri Lanka in Johannesburg, on 22 January 2017. In January 2020, he was named as one of the sixteen umpires for the 2020 Under-19 Cricket World Cup tournament in South Africa.

See also
 List of One Day International cricket umpires
 List of Twenty20 International cricket umpires

References

External links
 

1986 births
Living people
South African One Day International cricket umpires
South African Twenty20 International cricket umpires
People from Pretoria